Ruben Verheyden (born 22 December 2000) is a Belgian middle-distance runner, who specializes in the 1500 metres. He won the 1500m at the 2022 Belgian Athletics Championships, and the same event at the 2021 and 2022 Belgian Indoor Athletics Championships. He also won the 1500 m at the 2021 European Athletics U23 Championships.

References

2000 births
Living people
Belgian male middle-distance runners